Basbariya (Nepali: बसबरीया ) is a rural municipality in Sarlahi District, a part of Province No. 2 in Nepal. It was formed in 2016 occupying current 6 sections (wards) from previous 6 former VDCs. It occupies an area of 29.42 km2 with a total population of 23,568.

References 

Basbariya Rural Municipality Map

Populated places in Sarlahi District
Rural municipalities of Nepal established in 2017
Rural municipalities in Madhesh Province